Lusophone music, is music that is sung in Portuguese.

Generally this term is not used outside of the internet, because of cultural differences between the peoples of the different Portuguese-speaking countries. The term refers to a language-based grouping and not based on musical characteristics since the music of Portuguese-speaking countries is most diverse.

Excluding Portugal and Brazil, in the Portuguese-speaking countries some music may be sung in Portuguese (for example, in Angola) but in these latter countries the music is overwhelmingly performed in languages other than Portuguese.

Music by language